Roberto Tamagnini (born 1 March 1942) is a Sammarinese former sports shooter. He competed at the 1972,  1976 and the 1980 Summer Olympics.

References

1942 births
Living people
Sammarinese male sport shooters
Olympic shooters of San Marino
Shooters at the 1972 Summer Olympics
Shooters at the 1976 Summer Olympics
Shooters at the 1980 Summer Olympics